Sharon Lubinski is the United States Marshal for the District of Minnesota. Lubinski is the first openly lesbian United States Marshal.

Early life and education
Lubinski earned an undergraduate degree at the University of Wisconsin–Madison and a master's degree from Hamline University in St. Paul, Minnesota.

Career
On October 13, 2009, President Barack Obama nominated Lubinski to serve as United States Marshal for the District of Minnesota. She was sworn into office on January 15, 2010, and retired in December, 2016.

References

Hamline University alumni
LGBT law enforcement workers
LGBT people from Minnesota
Living people
Lesbians
United States Marshals
University of Wisconsin–Madison alumni
LGBT appointed officials in the United States
Year of birth missing (living people)